The following is a timeline of the history of the city of Antananarivo, Madagascar.

Prior to 20th century

 1610 - Antananarivo founded as capital of the Merina Kingdom by Andrianjaka and is the oldest city in Madagascar.
 1710 - Capital of Merina Kingdom relocated to Ambohimanga from Antananarivo by Andriantsimitoviaminandriandrazaka.
 1794 - Capital of Merina Kingdom relocated to Antananarivo from Ambohimanga by Andrianampoinimerina.
 1800 - Population: 15,000 (approximate estimate).
 1840 - Manjakamiadana built in the Rova of Antananarivo (palace).
 1872 - British missionary church built.
 1895
 City besieged and captured by French forces during the Second Madagascar expedition.
 French colonists rename city "Tananarive."
 Population: 50,000-75,000 (approximate estimate).

20th century
 1909 - Brickaville-Tananarive railway begins operating.
 1910 -  opens.
 1913
 Tamatave-Tananarive railway built.
 Roman Catholic Apostolic Vicariate of Tananarive active.
 1918 - Population: 63,115.
 1923 - Antsirabe-Tananarive railway begins operating.
 1925 - Botanical and Zoological Garden of Tsimbazaza founded.
1929 - Protests against French rule
 1956 - City plan created.
 1958 - National Congress Party for the Independence of Madagascar headquartered in city.
 1959
 Flood.
 Richard Andriamanjato becomes mayor.
 1960 - City becomes capital of the new Malagasy Republic.
 1961 - University of Madagascar established.
 1964 - Population: 298,813 city (estimate).
 1971 - Population: 347,466 city; 377,600 urban agglomeration (estimate).
 1972 - Political unrest; city hall burns down.
 1976 - City renamed "Antananarivo."(fr)
 1983 - Midi Madagasikara newspaper begins publication.
 1993 - Population: 710,236 city.
 1995 - November: Rova of Antananarivo burns down.
 1997 - 1997 Jeux de la Francophonie held in Antananarivo.

21st century
 2001 - Senate building constructed (approximate date).
 2002 - Civil war.
 2005
 Population: 1,015,140 city.
 Meeting of the Association Internationale des Maires Francophones held in city.
 2007 - December: Andry Rajoelina elected mayor.
 2009 - January–February: 2009 Malagasy protests.
 2015 - Lalao Ravalomanana becomes mayor.
 2016
 November: Meeting of the Organisation internationale de la Francophonie held in city.
 December: Meeting of the Association des Villes et Collectivités de l’Ocean Indien held in city.
 2018
 April: Anti-government protest.
 Population: 1,521,898 (estimate, urban agglomeration).
 2022
 January: 2022 Antananarivo floods
African Youth Games to be held in Antananarivo.

See also
 Antananarivo history
 Timeline of Antananarivo (in French)
 List of mayors of Antananarivo

References

This article incorporates information from the French Wikipedia.

Bibliography

in English
 

 
 
 

in French
  (+ table of contents)

External links

   (Bibliography of open access  articles)
  (Images, etc.)
  (Images, etc.)
  (Bibliography)
  (Bibliography)
  (Bibliography)
  (Bibliography)
 

Antananarivo
Antananarivo
History of Madagascar
Madagascar history-related lists
Antanarivo